Bethel Assembly of God Church is a Pentecostal megachurch located in Bangalore City, Karnataka, India. It is affiliated with the General Council of the Assemblies of God of India. It is one of the largest churches in India. According to the church over 25,000 members attend services each week and has over 100 affiliated outstations under its coverage. Bethel Assembly of God Church was founded in 1960. M. A. Varughese was appointed in 1983 as the pastor-in-charge and he currently serves as the Senior Pastor of the church.

Linguistic Services 
Services are conducted in the following languages:
 Malayalam
 English
 Kannada
 Tamil
 Hindi
 Telugu
 French

Other Services 
Bethel Assembly of God Church launched a drive-in worship service where the congregation can attend the service from cars to maintain physical distancing during the COVID-19 pandemic.

Green Initiative 
Bethel Assembly of God Church pledged to plant 1000 tree saplings in Bangalore city on the occasion of their senior Pastor Rev. Dr. MA Varughese's birthday.

References

External links 
 Bethel AG International Church, English
 Bethel AG Church, Malayalam

Pentecostalism in India
Assemblies of God churches
Evangelical megachurches in India
1960 establishments in Mysore State
20th-century churches in India
20th-century Protestant churches